Departure is a 1986 Australian film directed by Brian Kavanagh.

Plot
A married couple decide to move to Rome and spend a final weekend in Australia.

Production
It was shot in Hobart and Richmond in Tasmania and only received a limited release.

References

External links
 

1986 films
Australian drama films
Australian films based on plays
Films scored by Bruce Smeaton
1980s English-language films
1980s Australian films